Dash Teymur (also Romanized as Dāsh Teymūr) is a village in Mokriyan-e Gharbi Rural District, in the Central District of Mahabad County, West Azerbaijan Province, Iran. At the 2006 census, its population was 84, in 14 families.

References 

Populated places in Mahabad County